Bret or BRET may refer to:

People and fictional characters 
 Bret (given name), a personal name, including a list of people and fictional characters
 Bret (surname), a list of people

Other uses 
 a regional name for either the brill or the turbot fish
 the spawn of the herring
 Tropical Storm Bret, various storms and a hurricane
 Bioluminescence Resonance Energy Transfer

See also 
 Lac de Bret, a lake in the canton of Vaud, Switzerland
 Bret v JS, a 1600 formative English contract law
 Brett (disambiguation)
 Breton language